is a Japanese voice actress and singer represented by Mausu Promotion. She is best known for her role as Souseiseki in Rozen Maiden, Makoto "Mako-chan" in Minami-ke, and Rita Mordio in Tales of Vesperia. Morinaga is also the lead singer of the goth rock band function code();.

Filmography

Anime 
2003
 Saint Beast ~Seijuu Kourin Hen~ - Pinky
 Wandaba Style - Sakura Haruno

2004
 Rozen Maiden - Souseiseki

2005
 Kamichu! - Matsuri Saegusa
 Keroro Gunsou - Moguko
 Transformers: Galaxy Force - Lori
 Blood+ - Nahabi
 Rozen Maiden ~Träumend~ - Souseiseki

2006
 Inukami! - Tayune
 Kiba - Mirette
 Jigoku Shoujo Futakomori - Yumie Hanamura (Episode 3)
 Simoun - Mamina
 Chocotto Sister - Makoto Ashirai
 Night Head Genesis - Naji
 Crash B-Daman - Aoi Saionji
 Black Lagoon - Kageyama （Second daughter）
 The Wallflower - Female Student
 Rozen Maiden Ouvertüre - Souseiseki

2007
 Princess Resurrection - Francisca
 Gakuen Utopia Manabi Straight! - Former Student Council President
 Kaze no Stigma - Ren Kannagi
 Claymore - Claudia, Diana
 Skull Man - Child
 My Bride Is a Mermaid - Mawari Zenigata
 Tōka Gettan Kōhi, Nero
 Minami-ke - Makoto "Mako-chan"
 Moetan - Ruriko
 Romeo x Juliet - Elder Sister, Girl
 Inukami! The Movie: Tokumei Reiteki Sōsakan Karina Shirō! - Tayune
 Hiyoko no Samurai: Hiyo Zaemon - Zaemon Hiyo

2008
 Kyōran Kazoku Nikki - Grim Reaper III
 Clannad After Story - Child
 Minami-ke: Okawari - Makoto "Mako-chan"

2009
 Saki - Ikeda Kana
 Tales of Vesperia: The First Strike - Rita Mordio
 Minami-ke: Okaeri - Makoto "Mako-chan"

2010
 Strike Witches 2 - Fernandia Malvezzi

2011
 Horizon in the Middle of Nowhere - Brown Algae

2012
 Horizon in the Middle of Nowhere 2 - Brown Algae
 Saki Achiga-hen episode of Side-A - Ikeda Kana

2013
 Rozen Maiden: Zurückspulen - Souseiseki

Video games
 Ar tonelico II Sekai ni Hibiku Shōjo-tachi no Metafalica - Frelia
 Otome no Jijou - Mami Tachibana
 Gadget Trial - Yu-ri
 Summon Night: Twin Age - Ugunia
 Simoun: Rose War ~Ri Mājon of Sealing~ - Mamiina
 D→A：White - Kuu
 Tales of the World: Radiant Mythology 3 - Rita Mordio
 Tales of Vesperia - Rita Mordio
 Tales of VS - Rita Mordio
 Torikago no Mukougawa - Doruche
 Fragments Blue -  Natsuon Igarashi
 Blue Flow - Rachael Jealous, Tamao Igarashi, Margaret Sherman
 Blue Blaster - Iris Lafayette
 Marriage Royale ~Prism Story~ - Sanjoh Asahi
 Monochrome - Hinamizu
 Lucky Star: Ryōō Gakuen Ōtōsai - Kou Yasaka
 Remember 11: The Age of Infinity - Cocoro Fuyukawa
 Onihimeden ~Ayakashi Hanashi~ - Tsukiyo Amamiya

Discography

CD 
 Gesshoku Kageki Dan: Neverland Navigation Record

Character CD 
 My Bride Is a Mermaid Character Single 3 『GAP』 - Mawari Zenigata
 Minami-ke Biyori - Makoto

Drama CD 
 Supa Supa - Chihaya Yuuki
 Ekoto Isshou - Taeko Ebisawa
 Kaze no Stigma - Ren Kannagi
 Kamiyomi - Emperor Antoku
 Zero In - Sakura Sonobe
 Rozen Maiden Original Drama ~Tantei - Detektiv~ - Souseiseki
 Rozen Maiden Träumend Character Drama Vol.4 - Souseiseki

Radio CD 
 Suigintou no Koyoi mo Ennu~i Vol.2 - Souseiseki

References

External links 
  
  
 

1980 births
Living people
Voice actresses from Tokyo
Japanese voice actresses
Japanese video game actresses
Singers from Tokyo
21st-century Japanese women singers
21st-century Japanese singers
Mausu Promotion voice actors